The expression Ager Gallicus defines the territory of the Senone Gauls after it was devastated and conquered by Rome in 284 BC or 283 BC, either after the Battle of Arretium or the Battle of Lake Vadimon.

Destruction of the Ager Gallicus
According to Polybius, unspecified Gauls besieged the city of Arretium (Arezzo, in north-eastern Tuscany) and defeated a Roman force which had come to the aid of the city. Their commander, the praetor Lucius Caecilius Metellus Denter died in the battle. This would place the battle in 283 BC because Denter was a consul in 284 BC. Denter was replaced by Manius Curius Dentatus, who sent envoys to negotiate the release of Roman hostages, but they were killed. The Romans marched on Gaul and they were met by the Senones who were defeated in a pitched battle.  Polybius used the highly generic term Gaul. He meant Gallia Cisalpina (Gaul this side of the Alp from the Roman geographical viewpoint) which was the name the Romans gave the area of the Gauls of northern Italy (as opposed to Gallia Transalpina, Gaul the other side of the Alps, which referred to what is now southern France). It can be assumed that this clash with the Senones occurred in the ager Gallicus, because Polybius wrote that "the Romans invaded the territory of the Senones, killed most of them and drove the rest out of the country and founded the colony of Sena Gallia (Senigallia)". Polybius did not specify who led this Roman campaign. He also wrote that "[h]ereupon the Boii, seeing the Senones expelled from their territory, and fearing a like fate for themselves and their own land, implored the aid of the Etruscans and marched out in full force. The united armies gave battle to the Romans near Lake Vadimon, and in this battle most of the Etruscans were cut to pieces while only quite a few of the Boii escaped." He also wrote that the next year the Boii and the Etruscans engaged the Romans in battle again and "were utterly defeated and it was only now that their courage at length gave way and that they sent an embassy to sue for terms and made a treaty with the Romans."

According to Appian, the Romans sent their ambassadors specifically to the Senones and for a different reason. The Senones had provided mercenaries to forces which had fought against Rome despite the fact that they had a treaty with Rome. The Romans sent ambassadors to remonstrate against this. Appian wrote that "Britomaris, the Gaul, being incensed against them on account of his father, who had been killed by the Romans while fighting on the side of the Etruscans in this very war, slew the ambassadors" while they were still holding the herald’s staff. He added some details which are most probably fictive and reflections of prejudice towards barbarians. He wrote that Britomaris wore their official garments and "cut their bodies in small pieces and scattered them in the fields." Publius Cornelius Dolabella, (the consul for 283 BC) "while he was on the march, moved with great speed" to the ager Gallicus "by way of the Sabine country and Picenum" and laid it to waste: "He ravaged them all [the Senones] with fire and sword. He reduced the women and children to slavery, killed all the adult males without exception, devastated the country in every possible way, and made it uninhabitable for anybody else." Appian added that "[a] little later the Senones (who were serving as mercenaries), having no longer any homes to return to, fell boldly upon the consul Domitius, and being defeated by him killed themselves in despair.

Appian’s text is unclear and confusing. He does not link the ambassadors’ event to the siege and battle at Arretium. He does not mention where the ambassadors met Britomaris either. The fact his father was killed by the Romans while fighting on the side of the Etruscans in the same war could suggest that this previous fighting was the battle of Lake Vadimon, which involved a combined Etruscan and Gallic army (the Battle of Arretium involved Gauls only). The second battle mentioned by Polybius, in which the Etruscans and Gauls were defeated again and sued for peace, may well correspond with the second battle mentioned by Appian. However, while Polybius places this second battle against an Etrusco-Gallic force in the previous year (284 BC), Appian claims that it was won by Gnaeus Domitius Calvinus Maximus, who was the other consul for 283 BC. Appian did not mention the Boii Gauls in the second battle. It does not seem that there is a reference to the battle of Arretium as there is no mention of a siege, of a battle between Romans and Gauls only, or Roman prisoners, and the purpose of the Roman embassy was different. The lack of mention of where the battles were fought compounds the problem.

Territory 
The territory corresponds to the portion of the modern Marche region lying north of the Esino river, on the coast Adriatic Sea.

In order to control the population and mercantile activities of the Ager, the Romans founded the coastal colonies of Sena Gallica (Senigallia), Ariminum (Rimini), Pisaurum (Pesaro) and Fanum Fortunae (Fano). The administration of the inland was organized in 232 BC by the Lex Flaminia de agro Gallico et Piceno viritim dividendo, which created a network of prefectures (praefecturae), some of which, in the mid-1st century BC, were granted the status of municipia: Aesis (Jesi), Suasa, Ostra, and Forum Sempronii (Fossombrone).

The construction, in 220 BC, of the Via Flaminia shifted the relative position of the Ager, which was now connected to the seat of power by the consular road that traversed it along the  Metauro river valley.

Later administrative organization 
After the Augustan administrative reorganization of the Italian peninsula, the Ager Gallicus was united with Umbria and became part of the Regio VI Umbria et ager Gallicus.

The Diocletian reform of 300 AD split the Ager from Umbria, and combined with the Picenum to become the province Flaminia et Picenum.

Later, under emperor Theodosius I, the territory was split again (this time from Picenum, which became the province of Picenum Suburbicarium), and became part of the province of Flaminia et Picenum Annonarium. Some scholars see in this new name, which for the first time included the word "Picenum", as an acknowledgement (albeit belated) by Rome of the Italic people known as the Piceni, which had lived in the area between the 10th and 4th century BC.

References

Further reading

Primary sources 
Appian, Appian's Roman History I: Vol. 1, Books 1+8.1 (Loeb Classical Library), Loeb, 1989; 

Secondary sources 
 P.L. Dall'Aglio - S. De Maria - A. Mariotti (eds.), Archeologia delle valli marchigiane Misa, Nevola e Cesano, Perugia 1991
 Nereo Alfieri, Scritti di topografia antica sulle Marche, a cura di Gianfranco Paci, Editrice Tipigraf, 2000, 
 Mario Luni (ed.), La Via Flaminia nell'ager Gallicus, Urbino 2002

History of le Marche